William Higgins was a Welsh professional rugby league footballer who played in the 1900s.

International honours
William Higgins represented Welsh League XIII while at Merthyr Tydfil in the 14-13 victory over Australia at Penydarren Park, Merthyr Tydfil on Tuesday 19 January 1909.

References

External links
(archived by web.archive.org) Stats → Past Players → H at hullfc.com
(archived by web.archive.org) Statistics at hullfc.com

Ebbw Vale RLFC players
Hull F.C. players
Place of birth missing
Place of death missing
Rugby league centres
Rugby league wingers
Welsh League rugby league team players
Welsh rugby league players
Year of birth missing
Year of death missing